Gregory Orr may refer to:

 Gregory Orr (filmmaker) (born 1954), American writer and director of documentary and fiction films
 Gregory Orr (poet) (born 1947), American poet